The Meridian 25 is a Dutch and American built trailerable sailboat that was designed by American Philip Rhodes as a cruiser and first built in 1960.

Production
The design was initially built in 1960 by the Amsterdam, Netherlands shipyard De Vries Lentsch, with some of these boats imported into the United States. The de Vries Lentsch Meridian 25 was available in three models: the Bermuda, Macinac and the Vinyard. Later, Seafarer Yachts in Huntington, New York, United States introduced a new version of the design, although it is now out of production. Due to the preponderance of models built, the boats finished vary in layout, equipment and details considerably.

Design
The Meridian 25 is a recreational keelboat, built predominantly of fiberglass, with wood trim. It has a masthead sloop rig; a spooned, raked stem, a raised counter, angled transom; a keel-hung rudder controlled by a tiller and a fixed, modified long keel, with a cutaway forefoot. It displaces  and carries  of lead ballast.

The boat is normally fitted with a small  well-mounted outboard motor for docking and maneuvering. All models also had an inboard motor as a factory option.

The design has sleeping accommodation for four people, with a double "V"-berth in the bow cabin and two straight settee berths in the main cabin. The galley is located on both sides of the companionway ladder with a single-burner stove to starboard that slides after when not in use, an icebox under the steps and above the inboard engine, and a sink to port. The head is located in the bow cabin under the "V"-berth.

Operational history
In a 2010 review Steve Henkel wrote, "the first Meridians were imported from De Vries Lentsch, a well established Dutch yard. Later they were built at the Seafarer plant in Huntington, NY, on Long Island. Like many boats from the board of Philip Rhodes, she is pretty to look at, but because of her relatively narrow beam, slack bilges, and shallow ballast location, she is also relatively tender in a breeze, has a tendency to hobbyhorse in a chop, and has little elbow room below. Best features: The large windows in her doghouse help to allay any crew claustrophobia despite the narrow confines of the cabin. Worst features: The optional Kermath 10 hp Sea Twin inboard was mounted so low in the bilge that servicing (especially oil change) was extra difficult, and any casual bilge water that collects can corrode the crankcase and engine block. Also, the icebox sits immediately above the engine. As a consequence, despite three inches of insulation, the icebox's efficiency is badly compromised."

See also
List of sailing boat types

References

External links
Photo of a Meridian 25 at anchor

Keelboats
1960s sailboat type designs
Sailing yachts
Trailer sailers
Sailboat type designs by Philip Rhodes
Sailboat types built by Seafarer Yachts
Sailboat types built by De Vries Lentsch